The men's 400 metre individual medley competition of the swimming events at the 1999 Pan American Games took place on 3 August at the Pan Am Pool. The last Pan American Games champion was Curtis Myden of Canada.

This race consisted of eight lengths of the pool. The first two lengths were swum using the butterfly stroke, the second pair with the backstroke, the third pair of lengths in breaststroke, and the final two were freestyle.

Results
All times are in minutes and seconds.

Heats
The first round was held on August 3.

B Final 
The B final was held on August 3.

A Final 
The A final was held on August 3.

References

Swimming at the 1999 Pan American Games